Bedotia tricolor is a species of Madagascar rainbowfish endemic to Madagascar.  Its natural habitat is rivers. It is threatened by habitat loss. This species was described by Jacques Pellegrin in 1932 with the type locality given as a tributary of the Faraony River in the area of Manakara.

Sources

tricolor
Freshwater fish of Madagascar
Taxonomy articles created by Polbot
Fish described in 1932